Christian Lundström (born 31 March 1977) is a retired Swedish football striker.

References

1977 births
Living people
Swedish footballers
IFK Göteborg players
Västra Frölunda IF players
IF Elfsborg players
Halmstads BK players
Association football forwards
Allsvenskan players